HNLMS Jacob van Heemskerck may refer to following ships of the Royal Netherlands Navy:

 , a unique pantserschip (coastal defence ship)
 , a 
 , a 

Royal Netherlands Navy ship names